The men's 85 kg event at the 2017 Summer Universiade was held on 23 August at the Tamkang University Shao-Mo Memorial Gymnasium 7F.

Records 
Prior to this competition, the existing world and Universiade records were as follows.

 Initial records

 Broken records

Results

References 

Men's 85 kg